Reid House may refer to:

in the United States

 Nash-Reid-Hill House, Jonesboro, Arkansas, listed on the National Register of Historic Places (NRHP)
 Reid House (Little Rock, Arkansas), NRHP-listed
 Leonard Reid House, Sarasota, Florida, NRHP-listed
 Reid-Woods House, Sarasota, Florida, NRHP-listed
 Reid House (Atlanta, Georgia), also known as Garrison Apartments, NRHP-listed
 Reid-Jones-Carpenter House, Augusta, Georgia, NRHP-listed
 Reid-Glanton House, La Grange, Georgia, listed on the NRHP in Georgia
 Reid House (Chicago, Illinois), NRHP-listed
 Dr. William E. Reid House, Leesville, Louisiana, listed on the NRHP in Louisiana
 Reid House (Iuka, Mississippi), listed on the NRHP in Mississippi
 Stone-Reid House, Iuka, Mississippi, listed on the NRHP in Mississippi
 Reid-Kent House, Kalispell, Montana, listed on the NRHP in Montana
 Reid House (Missoula, Montana), listed on the NRHP in Montana
 Reid House (Pittsboro, North Carolina), NRHP-listed
 Gov. David S. Reid House, Reidsville, North Carolina, NRHP-listed
 Whitelaw Reid House, Cedarville, Ohio, NRHP-listed
 Hinkle-Reid House, Mill City, Oregon, listed on the NRHP in Marion County, Oregon
 Reid-White-Philbin House, Lexington, Virginia, NRHP-listed

See also
 Reid Farm, Jackson Hill, North Carolina, NRHP-listed